Lunik is a band from Switzerland. There are currently three members.

Lunik started in 1997 with Adi Amstutz, Luk Zimmermann, Mats Marti, Walo Müller and Anton Höglhammer. Singer Jaël joined the band in 1998 and Anton Höglhammer left the line-up. 1999 saw the release of their debut album Rumour, recorded largely in an atmospheric trip hop style. Bassist Walo Müller left the band after the accompanying tour, and the second album Ahead (2001) saw the band steering towards a pop sound. Oli Müller supported the band as bassist in the live performances, and Adi Amstutz left the band.

The third album Weather (2003) was a huge success in Switzerland, with an acoustic approach from Jaël, Luk, and Mats replacing the electronica of the earlier albums. Cédric Monnier (keyboards) and Jacob Suske (bass) joined the band as supporting players on the acoustic tour for Weather. A live album, Life is On Our Side, appeared in 2004. Cédric Monnier and Jacob Suske joined the official line-up in 2005, and Mats Marti departed at the same time. In the beginning of 2006, Chrigel Bosshard joined Lunik as the new drummer, but left the band at the end of 2011. Jacob Suske (bass) left the band again in September 2008.

In July 2013 the band members announced that they will split up on their own solo careers. A final album with unfinished works will be released under the title "Encore". The band will also tour for one final time.

Band members

Last line-up
Jaël - vocals, rhythm-guitar
Luk Zimmermann - lead-guitar
Cédric Monnier - keyboards

Discography

Studio albums

Other albums

Singles

Wojtek feat. Lunik & Vida Breve - Encore un soir
DJ Tatana feat. Jaël - Always On My Mind
 No. 6 on Swiss Singles Chart
Delerium feat. Jaël - After All
 No. 9 on US Dance / Club Play Chart
Mich Gerber feat. Jaël - You Remain
Mich Gerber feat. Jaël - Stop Crying
Mensano feat. Jaël - Doesn't Care
Delerium feat. Jaël - Lost and Found
 No. 4 on US Dance / Club Play Chart
Schiller feat. Jaël - Tired
Schiller feat. Jaël - I Need You
Mensano feat. Jaël - Nowhere

See also
 Jaël

External links

Official website

References

Musical groups established in 1997
Swiss pop music groups

vi:Lunik